Tawaz  is a town and commune in the central Adrar Region of Mauritania.

Communes of Mauritania